Robert Raymond Tway IV (born May 4, 1959) is an American professional golfer who has won numerous tournaments including eight PGA Tour victories. He spent 25 weeks in the top 10 of the Official World Golf Ranking in 1986–87.

Early life
Tway was born in Oklahoma City, Oklahoma. He was introduced to golf at the age of five by his father and grandfather. He participated in his first tournament at age seven. He won the Redding Country Club Championship as a junior golfer in Redding, Connecticut. Tway attended Oklahoma State University in Stillwater, Oklahoma, where he had a distinguished career as a member of the golf team — a three-time, first-team All-American his last three years. In 1978, Tway's freshman year, the Cowboys, led by seniors Lindy Miller and David Edwards, won the NCAA Championship. When Oklahoma State won again two years later, Tway was their star player. He was the winner of the Haskins Award in his senior year. He turned pro in 1981 and joined the PGA Tour in 1985.

Professional career
In 1986, he was named PGA Player of the Year and finished the season with four victories including one major, the PGA Championship. He was second on the final money list that year — just a few dollars behind Greg Norman.

The 1986 PGA Championship was held at the Inverness Club in Toledo, Ohio. Tway finished with a score of 276 - a two-stroke margin of victory over Greg Norman. Tway had holed a greenside bunker shot at the 18th hole on the final day, which is a memorable shot in golf history.

Tway is also known for recording the worst score on the 17th Hole at TPC Sawgrass, which occurred during the third round of the 2005 Players Championship. His first four attempts ended up in the water. After finally hitting the green on his fifth attempt, he three putted for 12 to go from 7-under-par and 4 strokes out of the lead to 2-over-par and 13 behind the leader.

Tway has PGA Tour career earnings in excess of 14 million dollars. Upon reaching the age of 50 in May 2009, Tway began play on the Champions Tour. His best finish in that venue is T-2 at the 2009 Administaff Small Business Classic, two strokes behind tournament winner John Cook.

Personal life
Tway lives in Edmond, Oklahoma and enjoys snow skiing, fishing and a variety of other sports. Tway's son, Kevin, celebrated his 17th birthday by winning the U.S. Junior Amateur in 2005. Kevin turned professional in 2011 and won a Web.com Tour event in 2013, and his first PGA Tour event in 2018 at the Safeway Open.

Amateur wins
this list may be incomplete
1978 Trans-Mississippi Amateur
1980 Southern Amateur

Professional wins (14)

PGA Tour wins (8)

*Note: The 1986 Shearson Lehman Brothers Andy Williams Open was shortened to 54 holes due to rain.

PGA Tour playoff record (4–4)

Other wins (6)
1980 Georgia Open (as an amateur, tie with Tim Simpson)
1984 "The Shootout" (with Charlie Bolling) – tied with Bob Charles and Russ Cochran
1985 Oklahoma Open
1987 Oklahoma Open, Chrysler Team Championship (with Mike Hulbert)
1988 Fred Meyer Challenge (with Paul Azinger)

Major championships

Wins (1)

Results timeline

CUT = missed the half way cut
"T" indicates a tie for a place.

Summary

Most consecutive cuts made – 7 (1987 U.S. Open – 1988 PGA)
Longest streak of top-10s – 2 (1986 Masters – 1986 U.S. Open)

Results in The Players Championship

CUT = missed the halfway cut
"T" indicates a tie for a place

Results in World Golf Championships

1Cancelled due to 9/11

QF, R16, R32, R64 = Round in which player lost in match play
"T" = Tied
NT = No tournament

U.S. national team appearances
Amateur
Eisenhower Trophy: 1980 (winners)

Professional
Four Tours World Championship: 1986, 1991
World Cup: 2004

See also
1984 PGA Tour Qualifying School graduates
List of golfers with most PGA Tour wins
List of men's major championships winning golfers

References

External links

American male golfers
Oklahoma State Cowboys golfers
PGA Tour golfers
PGA Tour Champions golfers
Winners of men's major golf championships
Golfers from Oklahoma
Sportspeople from Oklahoma City
Sportspeople from Edmond, Oklahoma
1959 births
Living people